Dick Wilson was an Australian professional rugby league footballer who played in the 1960s. He played for Balmain in the New South Wales Rugby League (NSWRL) competition.

Playing career
Wilson made his first grade debut for Balmain in 1960. In 1963, Wilson was selected to play for New South Wales and played in one game against Queensland which New South Wales won convincingly 31-5. At club level, Wilson played in Balmain's semi final defeat against Parramatta.

Balmain reached the 1964 NSWRL grand final by defeating North Sydney and then Parramatta in the preliminary final. The opponents in the grand final were the all conquering St George side. Wilson played at hooker in the final as Balmain took a shock halftime lead over St George before Saints came back in the second half to win 11-6 at the Sydney Cricket Ground.

Wilson played with Balmain until the end of the 1966 season. He missed out selection in the 1966 NSWRL grand final against St George which Balmain lost. Wilson was then controversially sacked by the Balmain club after it was revealed that he had been betting on matches. Wilson's former teammate Arthur Beetson later came to the defense of Wilson citing hypocrisy from the NSWRL board. Wilson died on 15 January 2000.

References

2000 deaths
Balmain Tigers players
New South Wales rugby league team players
Australian rugby league players
Rugby league hookers
Year of birth missing
Rugby league players from Sydney